"To This Day" is a spoken word poem written by Shane Koyczan. In the poem, Koyczan talks about bullying he and others received during their lives and its deep, long-term impact.

Background
The animated film for "To This Day" was released onto YouTube on February 19, 2013. The video received 1.4 million hits in the first two days and currently has over 25 million. It features the work of 12 animators, supported by 80 artists. Koyczan first came to international notice when he read his poetry at the 2010 Vancouver Olympics' Opening Ceremony.

The poem describes Koyczan's experience of being abandoned by his parents, to be brought up by his grandmother Loretta Mozart and how he was bullied at school, given the name 'Pork Chop'. He commented: 
My hope is [that it] would reach some of the people who were just out there looking for something to get them through another day. When I wrote the poem two years ago and people started coming to me because they just needed to talk after hearing it, I realized this is not a Canadian problem or an American problem, it’s everywhere...I believe the bullies must be forgiven. That’s how we heal.

Koyczan describes how, following torment at school, he became a bully himself around the age of 14, an image of the thing he hated. He says that keeping communication channels open and clear between parents and their children will help address bullying issues. He commented that he hopes the poem and the project will promote a connectivity between those who have suffered from bullying, that they might feel less isolated. The project aims to help schools engage better with bullying and child suicide.

Reception for the poem has been overwhelmingly positive, receiving coverage on CBS and CBC News. Koyczan was chosen to read the poem and show to film at the TED conference, California, in 2013, accompanied by  violinist Hannah Epperson. After the video's release Koyczan received hundreds of letters from people that have experienced bullying.

The poem is part of the To This Day project and was released to mark Pink Shirt Day, an anti-bullying initiative. The project aims to highlight the deep and long-term impact of bullying on the individual and help schools engage better with bullying and child suicide.

References

External links
YouTube video

2013 poems
Canadian poems
Bullying
2013 YouTube videos
Viral videos